Gayathripuram is a locality of Mysore, city in South Indian state of Karnataka, India.

Location 
Located between Veeranagere, Narasimharaja Mohalla, Gandhinagar and Kanteerava Narasimharaja Pura, Gayathripuram is one of the localities formed during Maharaja's rule.

References 

Suburbs of Mysore
Mysore North